Sri.S. K. Venkatesan was elected to the Tamil Nadu Legislative Assembly from the Maduranthakam constituency in the 1996 elections. He was a candidate of the Dravida Munnetra Kazhagam (DMK) party. He died on 29 August 2021, due to health-related issues.

References 

20th-century births
2021 deaths
Tamil Nadu MLAs 1996–2001
Dravida Munnetra Kazhagam politicians
People from Kanchipuram district
Year of birth missing